Eupithecia thalictrata is a moth in the family Geometridae. It is found from Europe (France, Switzerland, Austria, Italy, Poland, Lithuania and Estonia) to the eastern Palearctic realm.

The wingspan is 18–20 mm. Adults are on wing from April to June.

The larvae feed on Thalictrum species (including Thalictrum foetidum and Thalictrum minus). Larvae can be found from June to July.

Subspecies
Eupithecia thalictrata thalictrata
Eupithecia thalictrata ijimai Inoue, 1963 (Russian Far East, Japan)

References

Moths described in 1902
thalictrata
Moths of Asia
Moths of Europe
Taxa named by Rudolf Püngeler